Acmaeoderini is a tribe of metallic wood-boring beetles in the family Buprestidae. There are at least 4 genera and more than 560 described species in Acmaeoderini.

Genera
These four genera belong to the tribe Acmaeoderini:
 Acmaeodera Eschscholtz, 1829
 Acmaeoderoides Van Dyke, 1942
 Acmaeoderopsis Barr, 1974
 Anambodera Barr, 1974

References

Further reading

External links

 

Buprestidae
Articles created by Qbugbot